Ischnochiton is a genus of polyplacophoran mollusc.

Species

 † Ischnochiton abbessi (Cherns & Schwabe, 2019) 
 Ischnochiton acomphus Hull & Risbec, 1930
 Ischnochiton adelaidensis (Reeve, 1847)
 Ischnochiton aidae Righi, 1973
 Ischnochiton alascensis Thiele, 1910   
 Ischnochiton albinus Thiele, 1911
 Ischnochiton arbutum (Reeve, 1847)
 Ischnochiton australis (G. B. Sowerby II, 1840)
 Ischnochiton bergoti (Vélain, 1877)
 Ischnochiton bigranosus Kaas & Van Belle, 1990
 Ischnochiton boninensis Bergenhayn, 1933
 Ischnochiton bouryi Dupuis, 1917
 Ischnochiton broomensis Ashby & Cotton, 1934
 Ischnochiton caliginosus (Reeve, 1847)
 Ischnochiton carinulatus (Reeve, 1847)
 Ischnochiton cariosus Carpenter, 1879
 Ischnochiton carolianus Ferreira, 1984
 Ischnochiton cessaci (Rochebrune, 1881)
 Ischnochiton chaceorum Kaas & Van Belle, 1990
 Ischnochiton circumvallatus (Reeve, 1847) 
 † Ischnochiton cliftonensis Ashby & Cotton, 1939 
 Ischnochiton colubrifer (Reeve, 1848) 
 Ischnochiton comptus (Gould, 1859)    
 Ischnochiton contractus (Reeve, 1847)
 † Ischnochiton cossyrus Ashby & Cotton, 1939 
 Ischnochiton crassus Kaas, 1985
 Ischnochiton crebristriatus Cochran, 1988
 † Ischnochiton crovatoi Dell'Angelo, Sosso & Bonfitto, 2019
 Ischnochiton dilatosculptus Kaas, 1982 
 Ischnochiton dispar (G. B. Sowerby I, 1832)
 Ischnochiton distigmatus Hull, 1924
 Ischnochiton dorsuosus Haddon, 1886
 † Ischnochiton durius Ashby & Cotton, 1939 
 Ischnochiton elizabethensis Pilsbry, 1894
 Ischnochiton elongatus (Blainville, 1825)
 Ischnochiton erythronotus (C. B. Adams, 1845) – multihued chiton  
 Ischnochiton evanida  G.B. Sowerby II, 1840  
 Ischnochiton examinandus Hull, 1923
 Ischnochiton falcatus Hull, 1912
 † Ischnochiton fehsei Cherns & Schwabe, 2019 
 Ischnochiton feliduensis E. A. Smith, 1903
 Ischnochiton fraternus Thiele, 1909
 Ischnochiton fruticosus (Gould, 1846)
 Ischnochiton gallensis Knorre, 1925
 Ischnochiton goreensis Thiele, 1909
 Ischnochiton goudi Kaas, 1996
 Ischnochiton granulifer Thiele, 1909  
 Ischnochiton guatemalensis Thiele, 1909
 Ischnochiton hakodadensis Carpenter, 1893  
 Ischnochiton hartmeyeri Thiele, 1910 – multiringed chiton
 Ischnochiton hayamii Owada, 2018
 Ischnochiton indianus Leloup, 1981
 Ischnochiton indifferens Thiele, 1911
 Ischnochiton intermedius Hedley & Hull, 1912
 Ischnochiton kaasi Ferreira, 1987
 Ischnochiton keili Plate, 1899
 † Ischnochiton korytnicensis Bałuk, 1971 
 Ischnochiton lentiginosus (G. B. Sowerby II, 1840)
 † Ischnochiton ligusticus Dell'Angelo, Sosso, Prudenza & Bonfitto, 2013  
 Ischnochiton lineolatus (Blainville, 1825)
 Ischnochiton lividus
 Ischnochiton lopesi Kaas, 1974
 Ischnochiton luteoroseus Suter, 1907 
 Ischnochiton luticolens Hull, 1923
 Ischnochiton macleani Ferreira, 1978
 Ischnochiton manazuruensis Owada, 2016
 Ischnochiton maorianus Iredale, 1914
 Ischnochiton mawlei Iredale & May, 1916
 Ischnochiton mayi Pilsbry, 1895
 Ischnochiton melinus Dall, 1926
 Ischnochiton mitsukurii Pilsbry, 1898
 Ischnochiton muscarius (Reeve, 1847)
 † Ischnochiton neglectus Ashby & Cotton, 1939 
 Ischnochiton newcombi Pilsbry, 1892
 Ischnochiton nicklesi Kaas & van Belle, 1990
 † Ischnochiton nitidus Dell'Angelo, Landau, Van Dingenen & Ceulemans, 2018 
 Ischnochiton niveus Ferreira, 1987  
 † Ischnochiton numantius Ashby & Cotton, 1939 
 Ischnochiton obtusus Carpenter, 1893 
 Ischnochiton oniscus (Krauss, 1848)
 Ischnochiton paessleri Thiele, 1909 
 Ischnochiton papillosus (C. B. Adams, 1845)
 Ischnochiton paululus Is. Taki, 1938 
 Ischnochiton perornatus Carpenter, 1892
 Ischnochiton pilsbryi Bednall, 1897
 Ischnochiton poppei Kaas & Van Belle, 1994
 Ischnochiton pseudovirgatus Kaas, 1972 – blue-spot chiton
 Ischnochiton ptychius Pilsbry, 1894
 Ischnochiton punctulatissimus (G. B. Sowerby I, 1832)
 Ischnochiton purpurascens
 Ischnochiton purus Sykes, 1896
 Ischnochiton pusillus (G. B. Sowerby I, 1832)
 Ischnochiton pusio (Sowerby in Sow. & Brod., 1832)
 Ischnochiton quoyanus Thiele, 1909
 † Ischnochiton renardi Dell'Angelo, Lesport, Cluzaud & Sosso, 2018  
 Ischnochiton rhodolithophilus R. N. Clark, 2000
 Ischnochiton rissoi (Payraudeau, 1826) 
 Ischnochiton sansibarensis Thiele, 1909
 Ischnochiton sererorum (Rochebrune, 1881)
 Ischnochiton smaragdinus (Angas, 1867)
 Ischnochiton stramineus (G. B. Sowerby I, 1832)
 Ischnochiton striolatus (J. E. Gray, 1828)
 Ischnochiton subviridis (Iredale & May, 1916)
 Ischnochiton tenuisculptus (Carpenter, 1863)
 Ischnochiton textilis (Gray, 1828)
 Ischnochiton thomasi Bednall, 1897
 Ischnochiton tindalei Ashby, 1924
 † Ischnochiton tisurus Ashby & Cotton, 1939 
 Ischnochiton tomhalei R. N. Clark, 2000
 Ischnochiton torri Iredale & May, 1916
 Ischnochiton tridentatus Pilsbry, 1893
 Ischnochiton usticensis Dell'Angelo & Castriota, 1999
 Ischnochiton variegatus (H. Adams & Angas, 1864)
 † Ischnochiton vectensis Wrigley, 1943 
 Ischnochiton verconis Torr, 1911
 Ischnochiton versicolor (G. B. Sowerby II, 1840)
 † Ischnochiton vetustus Powell & Bartrum, 1929 
 Ischnochiton victoria Ferreira, 1987
 † Ischnochiton vinazus Ashby & Cotton, 1939 
 Ischnochiton virgatus (Reeve, 1848)
 Ischnochiton viridulus (Gould, 1846)
 Ischnochiton weedingi Milne, 1958
 Ischnochiton wilsoni Sykes, 1896
 Ischnochiton winckworthi Leloup, 1936
 Ischnochiton yerburyi (E. A. Smith, 1891)
 † Ischnochiton zbyi Dell'Angelo & da Silva, 2003 
 Ischnochiton (Ischnochiton) sirenkoi Dell'Angelo, Prelle, Sosso & Bonfitto, 2011
 Ischnochiton (Ischnochiton) yemenensis Van Belle & Wranik, 1991

Species brought into synonymy
 Ischnochiton abyssicola Smith & Cowan, 1966: synonym of Tripoplax abyssicola (A. G. Smith & Cowan, 1966) (original combination)
 Ischnochiton albus (Linnaeus, 1767): synonym of Stenosemus albus (Linnaeus, 1767)
 Ischnochiton exaratus (G. O. Sars, 1878): synonym of Stenosemus exaratus (Sars G. O., 1878)
 Ischnochiton floridanus Pilsbry, 1892: synonym of Stenoplax floridana (Pilsbry, 1892) (original combination)
 Ischnochiton mawsoni Cotton, 1937: synonym of Ischnochiton luteoroseus Suter, 1907 
 Ischnochiton pectinatus Carpenter, 1864: synonym of Lepidozona pectinulata (Carpenter in Pilsbry, 1893) (nomen nudum) 
 Ischnochiton retiporosus Carpenter, 1864: synonym of Lepidozona retiporosa (Carpenter, 1864) (original combination)
 Ischnochiton ritteri(Dall, 1919): synonym of Tripoplax trifida (Carpenter, 1864)  
 Ischnochiton ruber (Linnaeus, 1767): synonym of Boreochiton ruber (Linnaeus, 1767)
 Ischnochiton scrobiculatus (Middendorff, 1847): synonym of Lepidozona scrobiculata (Middendorff, 1847)

References

 
 
 Powell A. W. B., New Zealand Mollusca, William Collins Publishers Ltd, Auckland, New Zealand 1979 
 Spencer, H.G., Marshall, B.A. & Willan, R.C. (2009). Checklist of New Zealand living Mollusca. Pp 196–219. in: Gordon, D.P. (ed.) New Zealand inventory of biodiversity. Volume one. Kingdom Animalia: Radiata, Lophotrochozoa, Deuterostomia. Canterbury University Press, Christchurch

External links
 Gray, J.E. (1847). Additional observations on Chitones. Proceedings of the Zoological Society of London. 15 (178): 126-127
 Pilsbry, H. A. (1892-1893). Manual of conchology, structural and systematic, with illustrations of the species. Ser. 1. Vol. 14: Polyplacophora (Chitons). Lepidopleuridae, Ischnochitonidae, Chitonidae, Mopaliidae. pp i-xxxiv, 1-350, pls 1-40. Philadelphia, published by the Conchological Section, Academy of Natural Sciences
 Iredale, T.; May, W. L. (1916). Misnamed Tasmanian chitons. Proceedings of the Malacological Society of London. 12: 94-117 pls 4-5
 Thiele, J. (1891-1893). [continuation of F.H. Toschel Das Gebiss der Schnecken zur Begründung einer natürlichen Classification, 2: 249-334 [1891]; 337–409, i-ix  ]
 Gofas, S.; Le Renard, J.; Bouchet, P. (2001). Mollusca. in: Costello, M.J. et al. (eds), European Register of Marine Species: a check-list of the marine species in Europe and a bibliography of guides to their identification. Patrimoines Naturels. 50: 180-213
 Gray J.E. (1847). A list of the genera of recent Mollusca, their synonyma and types. Proceedings of the Zoological Society of London. 15: 129-219.

Ischnochitonidae
Eocene genus first appearances
Pliocene extinctions